2095 is a year in the 2090s decade

2095 may also refer to
 The year 2095 BC in the 21st century BC
2095 (number), the number 
2095 (novel), children's book by Jon Scieszka in The Time Warp series
2095 Parsifal, a main belt asteroid